Irene Sabido (born in Mexico City, Mexico), is a Mexican producer and writer, known for Ven conmigo (1975), El árabe (1980), and Los hijos de nadie (1997).

Filmography

Television

Works

References

External links 

Mexican television producers
Women television producers
Living people
Mexican telenovela producers
Writers from Mexico City
Year of birth missing (living people)